Gouaro Bay or Baie Gouaro is a bay in southwestern New Caledonia. It lies northwest of Moindou Bay. The settlements of Gouaro and  La Roche Percee lie on the bay and the Néra River empties into it on its eastern side.

References

Bays of New Caledonia